The Fate of Fenella was an experiment in consecutive novel writing inspired by J. S. Wood and published in his magazine The Gentlewoman in twenty-four parts between 1891 and 1892. When first published in book form its title was The Fate of Fenella: by Twenty-four Authors.

Description

The novel first appeared as a twenty-four part serial in J. S. Wood's weekly magazine, The Gentlewoman, in 1891 and 1892. Each of the authors wrote one chapter and passed the novel on to the next person in line.  The odd-numbered chapters were written by women, and the even-numbered chapters by men, thus alternating in developing the narrative – although one of the men in the list, "Frank Danby", was in fact a woman. Authors included Bram Stoker, Mrs. Trollope and Arthur Conan Doyle. The completed work was republished as a three-volume novel by Hutchinson & Co. of London in May 1892, with a review noting the absence of a controlling mind.

Contemporary review
The following appeared in The Spectator in May 1892.
The result has been a fairly readable novel, that tells an extremely silly story. The plot is ridiculous; the characters waver and change from chapter to chapter; but there are occasionally strong situations, and scraps of fairly good dialogue. On the whole, however, the book is an amusing one; more amusing still when the reader remembers the conditions under which it has been written, and the difficulties with which the separate authors had to contend.

The chapters
The quotation marks in some chapter titles are as shown in the book (from the "cheap" edition of August 1892 by J. S. Wood)
Helen Mathers, "Fenella"
Justin McCarthy, Kismet
Frances Eleanor Trollope, How it strikes a contemporary
Arthur Conan Doyle, "Between two fires"
May Crommelin, Complications
F. C. Phillips, A woman's view of the matter
“Rita”, So near — so far away
Joseph Hatton, The tragedy
Mrs. Lovett Cameron, Free once again
Bram Stoker, Lord Castleton explains
Florence Marryat, Madame de Vigny's revenge
Frank Danby, To live or die?
Mrs. Edward Kennard, "The scars remained"
Richard Dowling, Derelict
Mrs. Hungerford, Another rift
Arthur A'Beckett, In New York
Jean Middlemass, Confined in a madhouse
Clement Scott, "Within sight of home"
Clo. Graves, A vision from the sea
H. W. Lucy, Through fire and water
Adeline Sergeant, "Alive or dead?"
George Manville Fenn, Retribution
"Tasma", Sick unto death
F. Anstey, "Whom the gods hate die hard"

References

External links
 
 
 
 Bram Stoker Online txt and PDF versions of chapter 10.

1892 British novels
Novels first published in serial form
Collaborative fiction